Venezuela has a wide array of universities, offering courses in a broad variety of subjects, spread between a total 23 public and 24 private universities located across several states. As a result of a Royal Decree signed by Philip V of Spain, the Central University of Venezuela—the country's oldest—was founded in 1721 as "Universidad Real y Pontificia de Caracas". The campus was originally at the now-known "Palacio de las Academias" but, in 1944, president Isaías Medina Angarita relocated it to the University City of Caracas.

The second oldest university is the University of the Andes. Established in 1810 as the "Real Universidad de San Buenaventura de Mérida de los Caballeros", its origins date back to 1785 when Fray Juan Ramos de Lora founded a priest school in the city of Mérida. The University of Zulia—the third-oldest university—was founded in 1891 when the Federal College of Maracaibo was converted into a university. The government ordered the closure of the university for political reasons in 1904, and it remained closed until 1946. The University of Carabobo is the last to be founded before the twentieth century by being established in 1892 and dating back to 1833 when the College of Carabobo was created by presidential decree.

The first private university established in the country was the Andres Bello Catholic University, founded in 1953 as the "Catholic University of Venezuela" under the government of Marcos Pérez Jiménez. The development of the Nueva Esparta University begun when the Nueva Esparta College was established in 1954. After major improvements over the structure, the university was formally re-appointed under its current name. Originally designed as an extension of the Andres Bello Catholic University in 1962, the Catholic University of Táchira was established as an autonomic university in 1982, becoming the second catholic university in the country. The Metropolitan University's foundation dates back to 1960, when entrepreneur Eugenio Mendoza led a civil group to develop an institution "skilled to capacitate, with modern criteria, young students from all social classes." The university was finally established in 1970.

List

Public

Private

See also
 List of universities in Venezuela by size

Notes

 Most universities have main headquarters and several additional campuses spread across the country where additional careers are taught. This column only lists the main headquarters' location.
 The Universidad Católica del Táchira, founded as an extension of the Universidad Católica Andrés Bello, received its autonomy in 1982.
 The Universidad Católica Santa Rosa was originally entitled "Universidad Santa Rosa" at the time of its foundation in 1999. The name was changed in 2003.

References

Venezuela
Venezuela

Universities